Labichthys carinatus is an eel in the family Nemichthyidae (snipe eels). It was described by Theodore Gill and John Adam Ryder in 1883. It is a marine, deep water-dwelling eel which is known from the western Indian Ocean, eastern and western Atlantic and eastern Pacific Ocean, including the Canary Islands, the United States (including Hawaii), Brazil, and Madagascar.

References

Nemichthyidae
Fish described in 1883
Taxa named by Theodore Gill
Taxa named by John A. Ryder